The collision and plunge into Big Sandy River involving a school bus near Prestonsburg, Kentucky, on February 28, 1958, resulted in the deaths of 26 students and the bus's driver. It was the third-deadliest bus crash in United States history, tied for fatalities with the Carrollton, Kentucky bus collision in 1988. The only deadlier crashes were a 1963 bus-train crash in Chualar, California and the 1976 Yuba City bus disaster, which claimed the lives of 29 people.

Crash
On a cold and cloudy morning, after a period of heavy rains and thaw, a Floyd County school bus loaded with 48 elementary and high school students bound for school in Prestonsburg, Kentucky struck the rear of a wrecker truck on U.S. Route 23 and fell down an embankment into the swollen waters of the Levisa Fork of the Big Sandy River, where it was swept downstream and submerged.

Response
National Guard and other authorities and agencies responded to the disaster. On March 5, 1958, governor Happy Chandler ordered 500 nationals guardsmen from 9 different cities to join the effort to find those still missing. The bus was finally located by Navy divers, and removed from the river 53 hours later.

Victims 
Twenty-two children escaped the bus in the first few minutes as it became fully submerged in the raging flood stage waters and made it safely out of the river. However, 26 other children and the bus driver drowned.  

 Reva Cheryl Matney, 7, of Prestonsburg, Kentucky.  
 Sandra Faye Cline, 8, of Lancer, Kentucky. 
 Anna Laura Goble, 9, of Emma, Kentucky. 
 James Edison Carey, 9, of Emma, Kentucky. 
 Paulette Cline, 9, of Lancer, Kentucky.
 John Spencer Goble, 11, of Emma, Kentucky. 
 James Edward Goble, 12, of Emma, Kentucky.
 John Harlan Hughes Jr., 13, of Lancer, Kentucky. 
 Katie Carol Jarrell, 13, of Sugar Loaf, Kentucky. 
 Jane Carrol Harris, 14, of Emma, Kentucky. 
 Emma Joyce Ann Matney, 14, of Emma, Kentucky.  
 Kenneth Forrest Cisco, 14, of Sugar Loaf, Kentucky.
 Marcella Jervis, 14, of Emma, Kentucky. 
 Montaine Jervis, 14, of Endicott, Kentucky. 
 Linda Darby, 14, of Cow Creek, Kentucky. 
 Nannie Joyce McPeek, 13, of Lancer, Kentucky. She was predeceased by her parents, Allen Roby McPeek and Roma McPeek. At the time of her death, she was living with the Cline family. 
 Bucky Ray Jarrell, 15, of Sugar Loaf, Kentucky. 
 Doris Faye Burchett, 15, of Emma, Kentucky. Her body was found on April 16, 1958. Her uncle, Graham Burchett, headed volunteer search efforts to help recover bodies from the crash site for months after the crash.
 James Thomas Ousley, 15, of Lancer, Kentucky. 
 Margaret Louise Hunt, 15, of Cow Creek, Kentucky.
 Thomas Roosevelt Jarvis, 15, of Buffalo Creek, Kentucky.  
 Glenda May Cisco, 16, of Sugar Loaf, Kentucky.  
 Joyce McPeak, 16.
 Katherine Justice, 17, of Endicott, Kentucky. 
 Emogene Darby, 17, of Cow Creek, Kentucky. 
 Randy Scott Wallen, 17, of Lancer, Kentucky.
 John Alex DeRossett, 27, of Prestonsburg, Kentucky. He was the driver of the bus.

Aftermath 
The crash would become the impetus behind the formation of the Floyd County Emergency & Rescue Squad, founded by volunteers on April 27, 1958. To this day, the FCERS remains a 100% volunteer agency, and assists local police departments, volunteer fire departments, and EMS with auto extrication, search and rescue, fireground support, and EMS first response in addition to its original role as the primary water rescue agency for the area.

The 27-person death toll is tied with the Carrollton bus disaster in 1988 for the third highest number of fatalities resulting from a bus crash. Both happened in Kentucky and in each, the victims were all thought to have survived the initial collisions, but were unable to safely evacuate the school-type buses afterwards. After the 1988 crash, Kentucky changed its public school bus equipment requirements and requires a higher number of emergency exits than any other state or Canadian province.

Depiction in media 
Several months later, two American recording artists released songs about the crash: The Stanley Brothers, with "No School Bus in Heaven," and Ralph Bowman, with "The Tragedy of Bus 27." Neither made the national Billboard Hot 100 charts, but they did receive regional airplay in some parts of the country.

In recent years the accident has been the subject of two documentary films, The Very Worst Thing and A Life of Its Own, and the site of the bus accident has been marked by a sign bearing a dark image of a school bus superimposed with the names of the children and driver that died.

See also

Wayne Corporation – History of a different school bus manufacturer with information about bus safety engineering

References

 Prestonsburg School Bus Crash
 Big Sandy Bus Accident 1958
  (Archive.is link)
 Floyd County Emergency & Rescue Squad History

Bus incidents in the United States
Transport disasters in 1958
1958 in Kentucky
Floyd County, Kentucky
Transportation disasters in Kentucky
1958 road incidents
February 1958 events in the United States